Ray Gaston (born 22 December 1946) is a Northern Irish former footballer who played for Coleraine, Oxford United and Lincoln City. During his spell at Oxford, he played just 12 league games. Gaston also made one appearance for the Northern Ireland national side.

He made his Irish League debut for Coleraine F.C. in February 1965 scoring against Ards. Forming a potent partnership with Jimmy O'Neill (footballer born 1941) they helped win the Ulster Cup in 1968.

For Coleraine he scored 63 goals in 127 total appearances. He scored 14 goals in 26 total appearances for Harps. His son Paul also went on to play for Coleraine.

Honours
 Ulster Cup:
 Coleraine 1968-69
 North West Senior Cup
 Coleraine 1967-68

References

External links
Rage Online profile

Sources
 The Finn Harps Story by Bartley Ramsay

1946 births
Association footballers from Northern Ireland
Northern Ireland international footballers
Association football defenders
Coleraine F.C. players
Oxford United F.C. players
Lincoln City F.C. players
English Football League players
Ballymena United F.C. players
NIFL Premiership players
Finn Harps F.C. players
League of Ireland players
Living people